The Rhytismatales are an order of the class Leotiomycetes within the phylum Ascomycota.

Genera incertae sedis 

The following genera within the Rhytismatales have not been placed with any certainty into a family (incertae sedis). For those genera with a question mark preceding the name, their placement in this order is tentative.

Apiodiscus
Bonanseja
Brunaudia
Cavaraella
Didymascus
Gelineostroma
Haplophyse
Heufleria
Hypodermellina
Irydyonia
Karstenia
Laquearia
Lasiostictella
Melittosporiella
Mellitiosporium
Metadothis
Neophacidium
Ocotomyces
Phaeophacidium
Propolidium
Pseudotrochila
Tridens

References 

Leotiomycetes